Howmeh Rural District is a rural district (dehestan) in the Central District of Andimeshk County, Khuzestan Province, Iran. At the 2006 census, its population was 15,494, in 3,181 families.  The rural district has 24 villages.

References 

Rural Districts of Khuzestan Province
Andimeshk County